Mount Loura (Fello Loura in the Pular language) is the northernmost point and highest peak at  in the Fouta Djallon in northern Guinea. It is 7 km from the prefecture of Mali-ville. It is part of a complex of mountains called the Massif de Tamgue, which rises to steep cliffs on three sides, and provides views into Senegal and Mali.

References

Loura